Saravali is a village and a community in the municipal unit of Messatida, Achaea, Greece. The community is located at the southeastern edge of the agglomeration of Patras. The community consists of the villages Saravali, Agios Stefanos, Demenika (the largest village), Kefalovryso and Bakari. Saravali is 6 km south of Patras city centre. Adjacent communities are Petroto to the east, Patras to the north, Ovrya to the west and Krini to the south. The Greek National Road 9 (Patras - Pyrgos) runs through the community.

Population

History

The castle of Saravali was built by the Franks in the 13th century. An important battle of the Greek War of Independence took place at Saravali in 1822 between the Ottomans, who held the fortified city Patras, and the Greek independence fighters led by Theodoros Kolokotronis. Every year, the commemoration of the battle is celebrated.

See also
List of settlements in Achaea

References

Messatida
Populated places in Achaea